Tanios El Khoury (4 May 1930 – 20 September 2022) was an eparch of the Maronite Catholic Eparchy of Sidon.

Life
El Khoury was born in Saghbine, Lebanon. On 14 June 1958, he received his ordination to the priesthood and was incardinated in the clergy of the Eparchy of Sidon. On 8 June 1996, Pope John Paul II appointed him Eparch of Sidon. The Maronite Patriarch of Antioch, Cardinal Nasrallah Pierre Sfeir, ordained him bishop on 5 October of the same year. His co-consecrators were Boutros Gemayel, Archeparch of Cyprus, and Roland Aboujaoudé, auxiliary bishop of Antioch. On 28 December 2005, Pope Benedict XVI accepted his age-related resignation.

External links
 http://www.catholic-hierarchy.org/bishop/bkhout.html
 http://www.gcatholic.org/dioceses/diocese/said1.htm

1930 births
2022 deaths
20th-century Maronite Catholic bishops
21st-century Maronite Catholic bishops
Bishops appointed by Pope John Paul II
Eastern Catholic bishops in Lebanon
Lebanese clergy